Anthony John Rolph Humphreys (born 9 June 1971) was an Australian cricketer who only played one match for Tasmania in the 1993–94 season.

External links
 

1971 births
Living people
Tasmania cricketers
Australian cricketers
Cricketers from Launceston, Tasmania